Long Life is a reggae album by Prince Far I, released in 1978.

Track listing
All tracks composed and arranged by Michael Williams
"Daughters of Zion"
"Right Way"
"Black Starliner Must Come"
"Praise Him With Psalms"
"In Your Walking Remember Jah Jah"
"Farmyard"
"Love One Another"
"Who Have Eyes to See"
"So Long"

Personnel
Prince Far I - vocals
Carlton "Santa" Davis, Sly Dunbar - drums
Robbie Shakespeare, George "Fully" Fullwood - bass guitar
Chinnaas Melchezinick - lead guitar
Eric "Bingy Bunny" Lamont - rhythm guitar
Bobby Kalphat, Errol "Tarzan" Nelson, Easy Snappin' - keyboards
Richard "Dirty Harry" Hall, Vincent "Don D. Junior" Gordon -horns
Bongo Herman, Prince Far I - percussion
Technical
Sylvan Morris - engineer
Dennis Morris - photography

Prince Far I albums
1978 albums
Virgin Records albums